The United Arab Emirates is situated in the Middle East and southwest Asia, bordering the Gulf of Oman and the Persian Gulf, between Oman and Saudi Arabia; it is at a strategic location along the northern approaches to the Strait of Hormuz, a vital transit point for world crude oil. The UAE lies between 22°50′ and 26° north latitude and between 51° and 56°25′ east longitude. It shares a  border with Qatar on the northwest, a  border with Saudi Arabia on the west, south, and southeast, and a  border with Oman on the southeast and northeast.

The land border with Qatar in the Khawr al Udayd area is a source of long-running dispute (in fact, whether it even shares a land border with Qatar is in dispute). The country's exact size is unknown because of disputed claims to several islands in the Persian Gulf, because of the lack of precise information on the size of many of these islands, and because most of its land boundaries, especially with Saudi Arabia, remain undemarcated. The largest emirate, Abu Dhabi, accounts for 87 percent of the UAE's total area. The smallest emirate, Ajman, encompasses only .

Boundaries

The UAE stretches for more than  along the southern shore of the Persian Gulf. Most of the coast consists of salt pans that extend far inland. A recent global remote sensing analysis suggested that there were 637km² of tidal flats in the United Arab Emirates, making it the 40th ranked country in terms of tidal flat extent. The largest natural harbor is at Dubai, although other ports have been dredged at Abu Dhabi, Sharjah, and elsewhere. Numerous islands are found in the Persian Gulf, and the ownership of some of them has been the subject of international disputes with both Iran and Qatar. The smaller islands, as well as many coral reefs and shifting sandbars, are a menace to navigation. Strong tides and occasional windstorms further complicate ship movements near the shore.

These northern emirates on the Persian Gulf and Gulf of Oman are part of the Gulf of Oman desert and semi-desert ecoregion.

South and west of Abu Dhabi, vast, rolling sand dunes merge into the Rub' al Khali (Empty Quarter) of Saudi Arabia. The desert area of Abu Dhabi includes two important oases with adequate underground water for permanent settlements and cultivation.

Prior to withdrawing from the area in 1971, Britain delineated the internal borders among the seven emirates in order to pre-empt territorial disputes that might hamper formation of the federation. In general, the rulers of the emirates accepted the British intervention, but in the case of boundary disputes between Abu Dhabi and Dubai, and also between Dubai and Sharjah, conflicting claims were not resolved until after the UAE became independent. The most complicated borders were in the Western Mountains, where five of the emirates contested jurisdiction over more than a dozen enclaves.

Mountains

The UAE also extends for about  along the Gulf of Oman, an area known as Al-Batinah coast. The range continues as the Eastern Hajar Mountains (Jibāl Al-Ḥajar Ash-Sharqī) for more than  into Oman. The steep mountain slopes run directly to the shore in many places. Nevertheless, there are small harbors at Dibba Al-Hisn, Kalba, and Khor Fakkan on the Gulf of Oman. In the vicinity of Fujairah, where the mountains do not approach the coast, there are sandy beaches.

Climate

The climate of the UAE generally is very hot and sunny. The hottest months are July and August, when average maximum temperatures reach above  on the coastal plain. In the Western Hajar Mountains, temperatures are considerably cooler, a result of increased altitude. During the late summer months, a humid southeastern wind known as the sharqi makes the coastal region especially unpleasant. Rain in the coastal region falls in short, torrential bursts during the summer months, sometimes resulting in floods in ordinarily dry wadi beds. The region is prone to occasional, violent dust storms, which can severely reduce visibility. The Jebel Jais mountain cluster in Ras Al Khaimah has experienced snow only four times (2004, 2009, 2017 and 2020) since records began.

Flora and fauna

Date palms, as well as acacia and eucalyptus trees, are commonly found growing at the region's oases. Within the desert itself, the flora is much more sparse and primarily consists of grasses and thornbushes.

The region's indigenous fauna had previously come close to extinction due to intensive hunting, which led to a 1970s conservation program on the Bani Yas island by Sheikh Zayed bin Sultan Al Nahyan; this resulted in the survival of Arabian oryxes and leopards, among others. The region's coastal fish consist mainly of mackerel, perch and tuna, as well as sharks and whales.

Area and land boundaries

Area:
Total: 
Land: 
Water: 0 km2

Land boundaries:
Total: 
Border countries: Oman ; Saudi Arabia 

Coastline: 

Maritime claims:
Contiguous zone: 
Continental shelf:  or to the edge of the continental margin
Exclusive economic zone: 
Territorial sea: 

Elevation extremes:
Lowest point: Persian Gulf 0 m
Highest point: Jebel Al Mebrah

Resources and land use
Natural resources: petroleum, natural gas
Land use: 
Arable land: 0.5%
Permanent crops: 0.5%
Permanent pasture: 3.6%
Forest: 3.8%
Other: 91.6% (2018)
Irrigated land:  (2012)
Total renewable water resources:

Environmental concerns

Natural hazards: frequent sand and dust storms
Environment - current issues: air pollution; rapid population growth and high energy demand contribute to water scarcity; lack of natural freshwater resources being overcome by desalination plants; desertification; beach pollution from oil spills
Environment - international agreements: party to:  
Biodiversity, Climate Change, Kyoto Protocol, Paris Agreement, Comprehensive Nuclear Test Ban, Desertification, Endangered Species, Hazardous Wastes, Marine Dumping, Ozone Layer Protection, Ship Pollution, Wetlands
Signed, but not ratified: Law of the Sea

See also
List of United Arab Emirates-related topics
Geography of Dubai

Notes

References